William McMaster (24 December 1811 – 22 September 1887) was a Canadian wholesaler, senator and banker in the 19th century. A director of the Bank of Montreal from 1864 to 1867, he was a driving force behind the creation of the Canadian Bank of Commerce of which he was the founding president from 1867 to his death in 1887.

He sat in the Senate of Canada from 1867 to 1887 as a Liberal. He also helped found McMaster University in Toronto (later moved to Hamilton), Ontario.

Biography
Born in County Tyrone, Northern Ireland, McMaster migrated to York, Upper Canada, (now Toronto) in 1833. He was married for the first time to Mary Henderson (18??–1869) of New York. He married a second time on 18 July 1871, to Susan Fraser (née Moulton), the widow of an American businessman.

He died in 1887 and is buried in Mount Pleasant Cemetery, Toronto.

Philanthropy
McMaster supported a number of causes with large donations. As a member of Bond Street Baptist Church, McMaster helped to finance its building of larger facilities at Jarvis Street Baptist Church. He also helped to finance Beverley Street Baptist Church, which is now Toronto Chinese Baptist Church, and a number of other Baptist churches in the Toronto area as well as the building of Toronto Baptist College in McMaster Hall on Bloor Street, later renamed McMaster University and funded by a large endowment upon his death. Through his wife, financing was also provided for the Hospital for Sick Children in Toronto.

See also 
 Elizabeth McMaster

External links 
 Biography at the Dictionary of Canadian Biography Online
 
 

Canadian bank presidents
Canadian Baptists
Canadian senators from Ontario
Canadian Imperial Bank of Commerce
Liberal Party of Canada senators
McMaster University
Members of the Legislative Council of the Province of Canada
People from County Tyrone
People from Old Toronto
Canadian people of Ulster-Scottish descent
1811 births
1887 deaths
Persons of National Historic Significance (Canada)
Canadian company founders
Irish emigrants to pre-Confederation Ontario
Immigrants to Upper Canada
19th-century Canadian philanthropists
19th-century Baptists